Kadri Prishtina (1878–1925), better known as Hoxha Kadri, was an Albanian political figure of the early 1920s.

Life
Hoxha Kadriu was born in Prishtina, in the Kosovo Vilayet of the Ottoman Empire. He took the first studies in his home town in Turkish language, studying later in Uskub school "Dar ul-Mualimin". He studied law and education in Istanbul, first in the Private Pegagogical Schools "Darüttedris" and later in the "Fatih" Medrese. On February 4, 1902 he joined the Young Turks movement. In 1904 he was arrested by Ottoman authorities because of his refusals to point to the author of "Fitret ul-Islâm", a problematic and controversial essay on the Islam religion, with Syrja Bey Vlora as author. He spent four years in Yedikule prison where he lost a leg due to gangrene. After his released he was interned in Tokat in north-eastern Anatolia where he worked as a lawyer. With the Young Turk Revolution of 1908 his persecution ended and he was sent in Samsun by the Black Sea to finish his studies. In 1911 he became professor of law, and was appointed in 1913 to work at the Bank of Istanbul, after that being expelled from Turkey.
During World War I he was stationed in Shkodër, north-west Albanian town. He formed there an organization called "Komiteti i Fshehtë" (Secret Committee) with a nationalistic programme.
He was one of the founders of the Committee for the National Defence of Kosovo, and was officially its leader for the time it operated based on Shkodër. Prishtina would be also in charge of representing the Committee in meetings and keeping correspondence for foreign factors. His deputy was Hysni Curri, and Bedri Pejani served as Committee's secretary.

He was appointed Minister of Justice of the Albanian government coming out of the Congress of Lushnjë. In 1921 he was Deputy Chairman of the Albanian Parliament. In December 1921 he was again appointed Minister of Justice of the short-lived government of Hasan Prishtina.

Several schools and streets in Albania and Kosovo bear his name.

As a publisher
In 1921, Prishtina published in Shkodër the newspaper Udha e së Vërtetës (Road of the truth). The newspaper served the Committee for the National Defence of Kosovo as well, after the Populli (The people) newspaper of Sali Nivica and Bedri Pejani was closed.

See also
Bajram Curri

References

Further reading
Hoxha Kadri Prishtina: jeta dhe vepra (Hodja Kadri Prishtina: life and work), Pal Pjetër Doçi, Publisher: Geer, Tirana, 2005. .

1878 births
1925 deaths
Politicians from Pristina
People from Kosovo vilayet
Albanians from the Ottoman Empire
Kosovo Albanians
Albanian politicians
Prisoners and detainees of the Ottoman Empire
Albanian Sunni Muslims
20th-century Albanian politicians
Albanian activists
Istanbul University Faculty of Law alumni